The stepped street, as it's known from academic works, or the Jerusalem pilgrim road as it has been dubbed by the Ir David Foundation, is the early Roman period street connecting the Temple Mount from its southwestern corner, to Jerusalem's southern gates of the time via the Pool of Siloam. It was used by ritual processions ascending from the pool to the Temple, Judaism's holiest site. The stepped street was built at the earliest during the 30s CE, with the latest coin found under the pavement dating to 30–31 CE, during the governorship of Pontius Pilate of New Testament fame.

History
In ancient times, in the celebration called Simchat Beit HaShoeivah, water was carried up from the Pool of Siloam to the Temple.

Description
The street went from Jerusalem's southern gates, along the ancient City of David, today part of the Palestinian neighborhood of Silwan, into what is now the Old City and passed by the Western Wall after passing underneath the Herodian bridge now known as Robinson's Arch.

The ancient path was improved and paved in large, well-cut stone in the pattern of two steps followed by a long landing, followed by two more steps and another landing. The street was eight meters wide and its length from the Pool to the Temple Mount is 600 meters.

A large drainage channel ran below the street.

Interpretation
According to archaeologist Ronny Reich, who for several years led the dig uncovering the ancient street together with archaeologist Eli Shukron, pilgrims used the Pool of Siloam as a mikveh for ritual purification before walking up the street to the Temple. However, Professor Elitzur opposes this interpretation and argues that the Pool of Siloam was a typical Roman public swimming pool.

Excavation history
Sections of the ancient street were first discovered by Charles Warren in 1884, followed by Bliss and Dickey of the Palestine Exploration Fund between 1894 and 1897. The find was reburied when their excavation concluded. Other sections were uncovered, then reburied, by later archaeologists, Jones in 1937 and Kathleen Kenyon in  1961–1967. More details about the street were published by Benjamin Mazar in 1969-1971, followed by Ronny Reich (alone or in collaboration with Yakov Billig, then Eli Shukron) between 1999-2011 (including findings from the drainage channel running beneath the street), and Eilat Mazar in 2000.

According to Israeli archaeologists, the street was rediscovered during excavations on a water channel from the Second Temple period.

See also
 Excavations at the Temple Mount
 Givati Parking Lot dig
 Jerusalem Water Channel, actually the drainage under the monumental stepped street
 Robinson's Arch
 Silwan

References

New Testament geography
Hebrew Bible geography
Siloam
Ancient sites in Jerusalem
Classical sites in Jerusalem
City of David
Establishments in the Hasmonean Kingdom
70s disestablishments in the Roman Empire

he:הגן הארכאולוגי ירושלים#הרחוב ההרודיאני